The 1992 US Open was a tennis tournament played on outdoor hard courts at the USTA National Tennis Center in New York City in New York in the United States. It was the 112th edition of the US Open and was held from August 31 to September 13, 1992.

Seniors

Men's singles

 Stefan Edberg defeated  Pete Sampras 3–6, 6–4, 7–6(7–5), 6–2
 It was Edberg's 6th career Grand Slam title and his 2nd and last US Open title.

Women's singles

 Monica Seles defeated  Arantxa Sánchez Vicario 6–3, 6–3
 It was Seles' 7th career Grand Slam title and her 2nd and last US Open title.

Men's doubles

 Jim Grabb /  Richey Reneberg defeated  Kelly Jones /  Rick Leach 3–6, 7–6(7–2), 6–3, 6–3
 It was Grabb's 2nd and last career Grand Slam title and his only US Open title. It was Reneberg's 1st career Grand Slam title and his only US Open title.

Women's doubles

 Gigi Fernández /  Natasha Zvereva defeated  Larisa Neiland /  Jana Novotná 7–6(7–4), 6–1
 It was Fernández's 6th career Grand Slam title and her 3rd US Open title. It was Zvereva's 7th career Grand Slam title and her 2nd US Open title.

Mixed doubles

 Nicole Provis /  Mark Woodforde defeated  Helena Suková /  Tom Nijssen 4–6, 6–3, 6–3
 It was Provis' 2nd and last career Grand Slam title and her only US Open title. It was Woodforde's 5th career Grand Slam title and his 2nd US Open title.

Juniors

Boys' singles

 Brian Dunn defeated  Noam Behr 7–5, 6–2

Girls' singles

 Lindsay Davenport defeated  Julie Steven 6–2, 6–2

Boys' doubles

 Jimmy Jackson /  Eric Taino defeated  Marcelo Ríos /  Gabriel Silberstein 6–3, 6–7, 6–4

Girls' doubles

 Lindsay Davenport /  Nicole London defeated  Katie Schlukebir /  Julie Steven 7–5, 6–7, 6–4

Other events

Men's singles masters championships

 Hank Pfister defeated  Peter Fleming 6–3, 6–4

Men's doubles masters championships

 Paul McNamee /  Tomáš Šmíd defeated  Bob Lutz /  Ilie Năstase 6–2, 6–3

Women's doubles masters championships

 Wendy Turnbull /  Virginia Wade defeated  JoAnne Russell-Longdon /  Sharon Walsh 6–3, 6–4

Mixed doubles masters championships

 Marty Riessen /  Wendy Turnbull defeated  Gene Mayer /  Virginia Wade 6–3, 7–6

Prize money

References

External links
 Official US Open website

 
 

 
US Open
US Open (tennis) by year
US Open
US Open
US Open
US Open